Kiba may refer to:

Places
 The Kiba district of Kōtō, Tokyo, Japan
 Shin-Kiba, Koto, Tokyo, Japan

Facilities and structures
 Kiba Station, Tokyo Metro
 Kiba Park, Koto, Tokyo, Japan; a park
 Shin-Kiba 1st Ring (New Kiba), an arena in Tokyo
 Kiba Hydroelectric Power Station, Uganda

People
 Ali Kiba (born 1986), Tanzanian musician
 Masao Kiba (born 1974), Japanese soccer player

Fictional characters
 Kiba Inuzuka, a character in the manga and anime series Naruto
 Kiba, a wolf character in the anime series and manga Wolf's Rain

Television
 Kiba (anime), fantasy anime series
 Kamen Rider Kiva, the 2008 Kamen Rider Series, originally known as Kamen Rider Kiba based on pronunciation

Other uses
 Kiba-dachi (kiba stand) of martial arts
 Kiba music, a genre of music among the Pedi people

See also

 
 
 
 Ki (disambiguation)
 Ba (disambiguation)
 Bodyguard Kiba (disambiguation)